Coffs Harbour Senior College is a government-funded co-educational comprehensive senior secondary day school, located within the Coffs Harbour Education Campus, on Hogbin Drive, Coffs Harbour, on the Mid North Coast region of New South Wales, Australia.

Established in 1995, the College enrolled approximately 470 students in 2018, in Year 11 and Year 12, including three percent of students who identified as Indigenous Australians and six percent who were from a language background other than English. The school is operated by the NSW Department of Education; the principal is Sam Hutton .

Overview 
The College is located several kilometres south of Coffs Harbour in an area which is becoming the centre of population distribution for the greater Coffs Harbour area. The College is affiliated with TAFE NSW and Southern Cross University on one site known as Coffs Harbour Education Campus (CHEC). The College provides opportunities for students in Years 11 and 12 to study in an adult learning environment and to gain the NSW Higher School Certificate.

A prime function of the College is to be a tertiary preparation centre for students. The students have access to computer laboratories, library facilities, commercial kitchens and a student learning centre which provide access to the latest technologies. The students also have access to a cafeteria, coffee shop, and other facilities that are not usually available in a traditional school, yet are available to the students studying at the Coffs Harbour Education Campus. The focus of the College is to educate young people in a more mature learning environment, with a focus on freedom and responsibility, care, cooperation and acceptance. Students are allowed to call teachers by their first names and close student/teacher cooperation is encouraged.

Campus 
The Coffs Harbour Education Campus is a partnership between the Southern Cross University, TAFE NSW and the NSW Department of Education. The comprehensive joint facility offers enrolment in articulated education and training programmes of each of the partners, ranging from Year 11 to postgraduate level. There are no sectoral boundaries between facilities on the campus; all are jointly owned and utilised as appropriate by the three partners. Students from Southern Cross, TAFE and the Senior College share the facilities. Classes from all sectors operate on an integrated timetable and the staff from all three sectors have offices in a shared environment.

See also

 List of government schools in New South Wales
 List of schools in Northern Rivers and Mid North Coast
 Education in Australia
 Coffs Harbour High School

References

External links
 
 NSW Schools website

Public high schools in New South Wales
Educational institutions established in 1995
Education in Coffs Harbour
1995 establishments in Australia